Wanakbori Thermal Power Station is a coal-fired power station in Gujarat, India. It is located on the bank of Mahi river in Kheda district.  There are eight units at this location, seven of each 210 MW and one of 800 MW capacity.

GSECL had recently entrusted BHEL with an order for setting up an 800-MW supercritical coal-based project at Wanakbori in Gujarat on EPC basis. BHEL has completed the construction activities and the 800MW was declared as commercially operational on 12.10.2019 at 1400 Hrs.

See also 

 Gandhinagar Thermal Power Station
 Ukai Thermal Power Station
 Sikka Thermal Power Station
 Dhuvaran Thermal Power Station
 Kutch Thermal Power Station

References 

Coal-fired power stations in Gujarat
Kheda district
1982 establishments in Gujarat
Energy infrastructure completed in 1982
20th-century architecture in India